Jamalabad Caravanserai (Persian: کاروانسرای جمال آباد) (Azerbaijani: جمال آباد کروانسراسی) is a historical caravanserai in Jamalabad, near Mianeh, Iran. The building was originally constructed in Ilkhanate era, but was repaired during the reign of Abbas II.

Although the building is attributed to the Ilkhanate, the inscription on top of its gate attributes it to Abbas II of Persia, and cites the date of construction as 1654–55.

This building was listed among the national heritage sites of Iran on 29 September 2002 with the number 6152.

References 

Caravanserais in Iran